Younes Ahamdi (born 14 April 1976) is a Moroccan judoka. Ahamdi participated in the 2004 Summer Olympics, where he was defeated in the round of 32 by Russian Evgeny Stanev.

Achievements

External links

References

1976 births
Living people
Moroccan male judoka
Judoka at the 2004 Summer Olympics
Olympic judoka of Morocco
20th-century Moroccan people
21st-century Moroccan people